Chinsali is a constituency of the National Assembly of Zambia. It covers Chinsali and several surrounding towns in Chinsali District of Muchinga Province.

List of MPs

References

Constituencies of the National Assembly of Zambia
1964 establishments in Zambia
Constituencies established in 1964